Events in the year 1919 in Belgium.

Incumbents
Monarch – Albert I
Prime Minister – Léon Delacroix

Events
 16 November – 1919 Belgian general election

Publications
 American Red Cross Work for Belgium: Summary of activities of Commission for Belgium, September, 1917 – December, 1918 (Brussels).
 Albert Joseph Carnoy, The Past and the Future of Belgium (New York, Knickerbocker Press).
 Léon De Paeuw, La Réforme de l'Enseignement populaire en Belgique (Paris, Armand Colin).
 Cardinal Mercier, A Shepherd among Wolves: War-Time Letters of Cardinal Mercier, edited by Arthur Boutwood (London, The Faith Press).
 J.H. Twells, Jr., In the Prison City. Brussels, 1914–1918: A Personal Narrative (London, A. Melrose).

Art and architecture

Business
 Standaard Uitgeverij established

Births
 23 November – Francine Holley, painter (died 2020)

Deaths

References

 
1910s in Belgium
Belgium
Years of the 20th century in Belgium
Belgium